Dorin Gigi Manole (born 5 August 1986) is a Romanian rugby union player. He plays as a fly-half for professional SuperLiga club CSM Baia Mare. He can also play as a wing or fullback.

Club career
Dorin Manole started playing rugby as a youth for a local Romanian club based in Tecuci and then started his professional journey joining the youth ranks of a local team in Focșani, under the guidance of coaches Genu Popa and Vasile Condurache. Between 2005 and 2009 he played for SuperLiga club Universitatea Cluj. In 2007, he was signed for a brief period by Russian club Slava Moscow. After playing in Romania for the past 5 years, followed a move to Spanish club CRC Madrid and after almost three years with the Spaniards he signed with Fédérale 2 club U.S. Orthez in France. A return to Romanian rugby followed and in early 2019 he was signed by SuperLiga side, CSM Baia Mare.

International career
Manole is also selected for Romania's national team, the Oaks, making his international debut at the 2008–10 European Nations Cup First Division in a match against the Schwarze Adler.

References

External links
 
 
 
 

1986 births
Living people
People from Galați County
Romanian rugby union players
Romania international rugby union players
CS Universitatea Cluj-Napoca (rugby union) players
Slava Moscow players
CSM Știința Baia Mare players
Rugby union fly-halves
Rugby union wings
Rugby union fullbacks